Peter Dobson (born July 19, 1964) is an American actor. His film roles include appearances in Sing (1989), Last Exit to Brooklyn (1989), The Marrying Man (1991), The Frighteners (1996), and Drowning Mona (2000), in addition to a cameo as Elvis Presley in Forrest Gump (1994). On television, he starred as the title character in the CBS comedy Johnny Bago (1993) and the lead of the USA Network comedy-drama Cover Me (2000–2001).

Dobson was born at Riverview Medical Center in Red Bank, New Jersey, to an activist mother and a contractor father. He grew up in Middletown Township and attended Middletown High School South. He later lived in Loch Arbour.

Since 2015, he has been in talks to make his directorial debut with the film Exit 102: Asbury Park.

Partial filmography

Modern Girls (1986) - Alan (Margo's Ex who kisses like a lizard.) (uncredited)
Plain Clothes (1987) - Kyle Kerns
Defense Play (1987) - Ringo
Sing (1989) - Dominic
Last Exit to Brooklyn (1989) - Vinnie
L.A. Takedown (1989, TV Movie) - Chris Sheherlis
The Marrying Man (1991) - Tony
Undertow (1991) - Sam
Where the Day Takes You (1992) - Tommy Ray
Doppelganger (1993) - Rob
Forrest Gump (1994) - Young Elvis Presley
Toughguy (1995) - Terry's Friend
The Frighteners (1996) - Ray Lynskey
The Big Squeeze (1996) - Benny O'Malley
Riot (1997, TV Movie) - Chaz (segment "Empty")
Quiet Days in Hollywood (1997) - Peter Blaine
Head over Heels (1997, TV Series) - Jack Baldwin
The Good Life (1997) - Gerard
Nowhere Land (1998) - Dean
A Table for One (1999) - Delivery Guy
Drowning Mona (2000) - Feege
Cover Me: Based on the True Life of an FBI Family (2000-2001, TV Series) - Danny Arno
Double Down (2001) - Cory
Snowbound (2001) - Gunnar Davis
Poolhall Junkies (2002) - Cory
Lady Jayne: Killer (2003) - Artie, Hitman #1
Dry Cycle (2003) - Maddox
Pledge of Allegiance (2003) - Salvatore Maldonado
The Poseidon Adventure (2005, TV Movie) - Agent Percy
Freezerburn (2005) - Vince Ruby
A-List (2006) - Jason
A Stranger's Heart (2007, TV Movie) - Jasper Cates
Made in Brooklyn (2007) - Jack
Protecting the King (2007) - Elvis Presley
Remembering Phil (2008) - Howard Nessbaum
2:22 (2008) - Curtis
Elwood (2011, Short)
A Dark Day's Night (2012) - Pete
American Idiots (2013) - Jesse Garrett
Jet Set (2013) - Jerry
20 Feet Below: The Darkness Descending (2014) - Jason
Fatal Instinct (2014) - Sgt. Birch
The Mourning (2015) - Mike
6 Ways to Die (2015) - Detective Wilcox
Hotel of the Damned (2016) - Jimmy
The Demo (2016) - Ray Nelson
Dirty Dead Con Men (2018) - Kook Packard

References

External links

1964 births
Living people
Middletown High School South alumni
People from Loch Arbour, New Jersey
People from Middletown Township, New Jersey
People from Red Bank, New Jersey
American male film actors
American male television actors
Male actors from New Jersey